Tierra Blanca could mean:

Places named Tierra Blanca 

 Mexico
 Tierra Blanca, Guanajuato
 Tierra Blanca, San Luis Potosí
 Tierra Blanca, Veracruz
 Tierra Blanca, Zacatecas
 Peru
 Tierra Blanca, Ucayali
 Costa Rica
 Tierra Blanca, Cartago
 United States
 Tierra Blanca Creek, a creek in Texas

See also 
 Battle of Tierra Blanca, a famous battle fought during the Mexican Revolution.